Roh is a given name or surname that is found in many different cultures.

South Asian names
Roh, sometimes spelled Noh, Ro or Lho, is a given name of Sanskrit origins, derived from the male given name Rohit, meaning "rising sun", or "red horizon".

Gaelic
Roh is also a Gaelic boy name, with roots from the Irish word "rough". It was a popular given name in the early Dark Ages, alluding to the fighting and rebellious nature of the Irish people.

Germanic
Roh also has Germanic roots as a given name and surname, the meaning of which vary from "rough soldier" to "curious knight".

Notable examples
 Franz Roh (1890–1965), German historian, photographer, and art critic
 Peter Roh (1811–1872), Swiss Jesuit preacher

Korean
Roh, officially transliterated as No, Ro or Lho is also a surname of Korean and other origins. The Korean Roh (also romanized Noh) derives from the Chinese surname Lu 盧/卢 or Lu 魯/鲁.

Notable people with the family name
 Lho Shin-yong (1930–2019), South Korean politician
 Roh Hoe-chan (1956–2018), South Korean politician
 Roh Moo-hyun (1946–2009), South Korean judge, lawyer, politician and 9th President of South Korea
 Roh Sang-rae, South Korean retired footballer
 Roh Tae-woo (1932-2021), South Korean retired politician and army general
 Roh Tae-hyun, South Korean singer and dancer

Japanese
Roh is a Japanese reading of the Kanji 朗 used in names.

Examples
 Roh Ogura (1916–1990), Japanese composer and writer

References